Anthony Adverse is a 1933 novel by American author Hervey Allen. It was published by Farrar & Rinehart.

The novel contains three volumes, and each volume contains three "books", making for nine books in total.

Plot 
The story follows the eponymous protagonist, Anthony Adverse, through several adventures around the world. This includes slave trading in Africa, his business dealings as a plantation owner in New Orleans, and his incarceration and eventual death in Mexico.

Reception 
Fanny Butcher of the Chicago Daily Tribune and Peter Monro Jack of The New York Times both gave the novel glowing reviews. Butcher wrote: "It is a thriller de luxe, but it is more than a melodrama of the most intricate happenings. It is the fantastic tale of a fantastic period, and it is the highest expression of the art of the picaresque which our generation has offered." Similarly, Jack wrote: "Anthony Adverse is essentially a story and a very great story, but it gathers up so much wit and wisdom by the way that Mr. Allen is revealed on every page as that rare thing nowadays, a creative humanist [...] We should not be surprised and we could not be anything but pleased if his Anthony Adverse became the best-loved book of our time."

The novel was the Publishers Weekly best-selling novel in the United States for two consecutive years: 1933 and 1934.

Film adaptation

In 1936, the book received a loose movie adaptation, drawing from the first eight books.

See also 

 Publishers Weekly list of bestselling novels in the United States in the 1930s

References

External links 

 Complete book on the Internet Archive

1933 American novels
American novels adapted into films